WR 1 is a Wolf-Rayet star located around 10,300 light years away from Earth in the constellation of Cassiopeia. It is only slightly more than twice the size of the sun, but due to a temperature over 100,000 K it is over 758,000 times as luminous as the sun.

Although WR 1 has been recognised as a Wolf-Rayet star since the 19th century, the WR 1 designation does not indicate that it was the first to be discovered. Ordered by right ascension, WR 1 is the first star in the Seventh Catalogue of galactic Wolf-Rayet stars.

WR 1 is a member of the nitrogen sequence of WR stars and has a spectrum with HeII lines much stronger than HeI lines, and NV emission more than twice the strength of NIII, leading to the assignment of a WN4 spectral type. The spectrum has particularly wide HeII, leading to the equivalent classifications of WN4-b (for broad) or WN4-s (for strong). The spectrum also includes CIV and NIV, but no hydrogen lines at all, indicating that WR 1 has already expelled all of its hydrogen through its powerful solar winds.

WR 1 is slightly variable and given the variable star designation V863 Cassiopeiae. The total amplitude of the variations is only 0.09 magnitudes at visual wavelengths. The variations are well-defined with a period of 16.9 days, but the light curve is not sinusoidal and its shape may vary. The variations have been ascribed to a dense asymmetric stellar wind and co-rotating interacting regions in ejected material.

It has been suggested that the variability and an infrared excess could be due to a cool companion, but WR 1 is now considered to be a single star. The WN-b subclass of Wolf-Rayet star are generally thought to be all single, in contrast with the WN-A subclass which have narrow emission on a stronger continuum and are thought to be binary systems with a more conventional hot luminous star.

Interstellar extinction is calculated to be 2.1 magnitudes, and at  the bolometric luminosity would be .

References

Cassiopeia (constellation)
Wolf–Rayet stars
Cassiopeiae, V863
Durchmusterung objects
004004
003415
TIC objects